Hamilton Independent School District is a public school district based in Hamilton, Texas (USA).

Located in Hamilton County, a small portion of the district extends into Comanche and Mills counties.

In 2009, the school district was rated "recognized" by the Texas Education Agency.

On July 1, 1989 the Pottsville Independent School District merged into the Hamilton district.

Schools
Hamilton High School (Grades 9-12)
Hamilton Junior High (Grades 6-8)
Ann Whitney Elementary (Grades PK-5)

References

External links
Hamilton ISD

School districts in Hamilton County, Texas
School districts in Comanche County, Texas
School districts in Mills County, Texas